Anguina may refer to:

 Anguina (nematode), genus in the family Anguinidae
 Anguina, a synonym of the plant genus Trichosanthes